Naushahro Feroze , is the capital city of Naushahro Feroze District in Sindh province of Pakistan. The district is located at 26°50'0N 68°7'0E with an altitude of 38 metres (127 feet).

Naushahro Feroze District borders Khairpur District in the north-east, Dadu District to the west Indus river makes a natural boundary between the two districts, Larkana District in the north-west, and its south-east border is surrounded by Nawabshah District.

Languages spoken include Sindhi, Seraiki, Balochi, Urdu, Punjabi, Pushto, Bagri, Brohi, and others.

Talukas

 Naushahro Feroze
 Moro
 Bhiria
 Mehrabpur
 Kandiaro
 Taluka or (Taluko as said in Sindhi language) Mehrabpur originally part of kandiaro and Bhiria, became a new taluka in July 2005.

Climate

Naushahro Feroze has a hot desert climate (Köppen climate classification BWh) with extremely hot summers and mild winters. There is very little rain, and it mainly falls in the monsoon season from July to September.

Notable people
 

Haji Khan Larik (1895–?), Muslim leader and freedom fighter.

References

Populated places in Naushahro Feroze District